Mario Alesini (17 December 1931 – 2 August 2001) was an Italian basketball player. He was part of the Italian team that finished fourth at the 1960 Summer Olympics.

References

1931 births
2001 deaths
Olympic basketball players of Italy
Basketball players at the 1960 Summer Olympics
Italian men's basketball players
Italian basketball coaches
Virtus Bologna coaches
20th-century Italian people